This is a round-up of the 1983 Sligo Intermediate Football Championship. After two years out of the Senior grade, Eastern Harps secured their return by winning the 1983 Championship, after defeating neighbours Bunninadden in the final. Bunninadden had qualified for the final after an objection to their semi-final conquerors Enniscrone was upheld.

Quarter finals

Semi-finals

 - Bunninadden objection subsequently upheld.

Sligo Intermediate Football Championship Final

Sligo Intermediate Football Championship
Sligo Intermediate Football Championship